McFee is a surname. Notable people with the surname include:

Allan McFee (1913–2000), often irreverent announcer for the Canadian Broadcasting Corporation's radio and TV networks
Bruce McFee (born 1961), Scottish politician
Henry Lee McFee (1886–1953), pioneer American cubist painter and a prominent member of the Woodstock artists colony
John McFee (born 1950), American singer, songwriter, guitarist and multi-instrumentalist
June King McFee (died 2008), contributor to the world of art education, with her research and publications
Malcolm McFee (1940–2001), English TV and film actor
Michael McFee, poet and essayist from Asheville, North Carolina
Oonah McFee (1916–2006), award-winning Canadian novelist and short story writer
William McFee (1881–1966), writer of sea stories

See also
Joel McFee Pritchard (1925–1997), Republican politician from Washington
McAfee
McPhee